RosFM is a small local radio station set up by CRAOL. It is a community radio station for County Roscommon.

See also
 County Roscommon
 CRAOL

External links
Official website

Community radio stations in Ireland
Mass media in County Roscommon